Murugappa Group is an Indian conglomerate founded in 1900. The Group has 28 businesses including nine companies listed on the NSE and the BSE. Headquartered in Chennai, the major companies of the Group include Carborundum Universal Ltd., Cholamandalam Financial Holdings Ltd., Cholamandalam Investment and Finance Company Ltd., Cholamandalam MS General Insurance Company Ltd., Coromandel International Ltd., Coromandel Engineering Company Ltd., EID Parry (India) Ltd., Parry Agro Industries Ltd., Shanthi Gears Ltd., Tube Investments of India Limited., Net Access India Ltd and Wendt (India) Ltd.

The Group has presence in several segments including abrasives, auto components, bicycles, sugar, farm inputs, fertilizers, plantations, bioproducts and nutraceuticals. It owns brands like BSA, Hercules, Montra, Mach City, Ballmaster, Ajax, Parry's, Chola, Gromor, Shanthi Gears and Paramfos. The Group has a workforce of over 50,000 employees. The current executive chairman is MM Murugappan.

The Group & family

Murugappa Chettiar Family

 Murugappa family
 Founder: 
 Dewan Bahadur A. M. Murugappa Chettiar

 Second Generation: 
A. M. M. Murugappa Chettiar
A. M. M. Vellayan Chettiar
A. M. M. Arunachalam

Group - Chairman(Murugappa Family) 

 Murugappa family
 Founder: 
 Dewan Bahadur A. M. Murugappa Chettiar

 Past Chairman: 
A. M. M. Murugappa Chettiar
A. M. M. Arunachalam
M. M. Muthaiah
M. V. Arunachalam
M. V. Murugappan
M. V. Subbiah
M. A. Alagappan
A. Vellayan

 Present Chairman: 
dissolved

History

1901–1910
 The foundation for this group was laid by Dewan Bahadur A M Murugappa Chettiar who established a money-lending and banking business in 1900.
 The business was first set up in Moulmein, Burma (now Myanmar) and then spread to British Malaya, Ceylon, Dutch East Indies and French Indo-China.

1921–1930
 In the 1930s the business was moved back to India.

1941–1950
 1947: Established Coromandel Engineering Company Limited
 1949: Established TI Cycles of India Limited (present day Tube Investments of India Limited) in association with Tube Investments Limited, UK(present dayTI Group)

1951–1960
 1954: Carborundum Universal of Madras India Limited (present day Carborundum Universal Ltd) was established in Madras, Tamil Nadu, as a tripartite collaboration between the Murugappa Group, The Carborundum Company Limited USA and the Universal Grinding Wheel Co. Limited, U.K
 1955: Tube Investments of India Limited Established Tube Products of India Limited in association with Tube Products (Old Bury) Limited, UK
 1960:Tube Investments of India Limited Established TI Diamond Chains Limited in association with Diamond Chain Company( USA) 
 1960: Tube Investments of India Limited Established TI Miller in association with Miller, UK

1961–1970
 1965: Established TI Metal Forming 
 1968: Purchased Kadamane Estates

1971–1980
 1978: Carborundum Universal Ltd acquired Eastern Abrasives Limited

1981–1990
 1981: Murugappa Group Took over EID Parry
 1983: 
 Murugappa Morgan Thermal Ceramics Limited is established as a JV between Morgan Thermal Ceramics division of Morgan Crucible Plc. UK and Carborundum Universal Ltd (CUMI) of Murugappa Group
 Murugappa Group established Polutech Limited in association with EPI( USA)
 1990: Tube Investments of India Limited Acquired Press Metal

1991–2000
 1991:
 The House of Khataus Group divested its share in Wendt (India) Limited (WIL) to Carborundum Universal Ltd (CUMI)
 Prodorite Anticorrosives Limited becomes a subsidiary of Carborundum Universal Ltd
 1993: 
 TIDC India acquired Satavahana Chains
 EID Parry merged Murugappa Electronics Limited with itself as Murugappa Industrial & Technical Services [Division] 
 1994: 
 Chevron Corporation Group California Chemical Company (now called Chevron Chemical Company) divested its share in Coromandel International to EID Parry
 Carborundum Universal Ltd acquired Cutfast Abrasive Tools Limited and Cutfast Polymers Limited
 1995: 
January: EID Parry de-merged Murugappa Industrial & Technical Services as MEL Systems and Services Electronics Limited 
June: Carborundum Universal Ltd acquired Sterling Abrasives Limited
December: Murugappa Group exited from the electronics business after EID Parry divested MEL Systems and Services Electronics Limited
 1999

 Tube Products of India acquired Steel Strips And Tubes Limited
 International Minerals and Chemical Corporation (IMC) divested its share in Coromandel International to EID Parry. Following this sale Coromandel Fertilisers Limited (present day Coromandel International) became a Group company.
 November: Murugappa Corporate Board formed
 Tube Investments of India Limited acquired Cholamandalam Investment and Finance Company Limited
Established Cholamandalam MS General Insurance Company Ltd

 2003:

July: Government of Andhra Pradesh divested its share in Godavari Fertilizers & Chemicals Limited to Coromandel International
November: Indian Farmers Fertiliser Cooperative Limited (IFFCO) divested its share in Godavari Fertilizers & Chemicals Limited to Coromandel International. Thus Godavari Fertilizers & Chemicals Limited became a Murugappa Group Company 
December: Godavari Fertilizers & Chemicals Limited merged with Coromandel International
 2006: Coromandel Fertilizer (present day Coromandel International) acquired Ficom Organics Limited
 2008: Carborundum Universal Ltd (CUMI) acquired Foskor Zirconia (Pty) Limited
 2009: Coromandel Fertilizer changed to its present name Coromandel International with new logo 
 2010: Tube Investments of India Limited acquired Sedis Chain France

2011–2020
 2011: 
 October: EID Parry acquired U. S. Nutraceuticals LLC (Valensa International), a Company based in Florida, USA
December: Coromandel International acquired Sabero Organics, a leading player in crop protection products
2013:
January: Coromandel International acquired Liberty phosphates, India's leading single super phosphate producer
2014:
October: Tube Investments of India Limited set up a plant for Large Diameter Tubes
2015:
August: TI Cycles of India acquired the Brand Licensing Rights for Ridley Bikes, Belgium
2016:
June: TI Cycles set up a new Bicycle factory in Punjab
September: CUMI launched cumidirect.com, an online store for warehouse equipment, power tools, and industrial ceramics.
September: Tube Investments of India Limited entered into a joint venture with Absolute Speciality to open Bicycle cafes in India under the Ciclo Cafe brand
2017: 
March: Tube Investments of India Limited’s incubation cell launched India’s first online-only Bicycle brand, Brooks
March: CUMI set up a new facility in Kochi for Composite Electro-minerals
Dec: TI Cycles announces the signing of an agreement for the acquisition of controlling stake in Creative Cycles & Great Cycles, Sri Lanka
2018:

Jan: EID Parry and Synthite Industries announce 50-50 joint venture
April: Coromandel International acquires bio-pesticide business of EID Parry (India)
Tube Investments of India Limited Launch a building construction material TI Macho TMT introduced in 27 November

2020:
November - Murugappa acquires 56% stake in CG Power and Industrial Solutions

Group companies

Present

 Agriculture & Chemicals: 
 EID Parry

Associates and subsidiaries
Alimtec S A
Coromandel International Limited
Parrys Sugar Industries Limited
Parry Sugar Refinery Pvt Ltd
US Nutraceuticals LLC

 Coromandel International 
Associates and subsidiaries
Coromandel Brasil Ltda
Dare Investments Limited
CFL Mauritius Ltd
Liberty Pesticides and Fertilisers Limited
Parry Chemicals Limited
Sabero Australia Pty. Ltd
Sabero Argentina S.A
Sabero Europe B.V
Sabero Organics America Ltda
Sabero Organics Mexico S.A de C.V
Sabero Organics Philippines Asia Inc
Parry America Inc
Coromandel International (Nigeria) Limited

Joint ventures
Coromandel Getax Phosphates Pt Ltd
Coromandel SQM (India) P Ltd
Yanmar Coromandel Agrisolutions P Ltd
Groupe Chimique Tunisien (GCT) and CPG of Tunisia
 Parry Agro

 Engineering :

Tube Investments of India Limited
Associates and subsidiaries
CG Power and Industrial Solutions
Sedis
Shanthi Gears
TI Tsubamex Pvt Ltd

Carborundum Universal
Associates and subsidiaries
Volzhsky Abrasive Works, Russia
Foskor Zirconia(Pty) Ltd., South Africa
Sterling Abrasives Ltd.,
CUMI International Ltd.,
Joint ventures
Wendt GmbH
Murugappa Morgan Thermal Ceramics

Coromandel Engineering Company Limited (CEC)

 Finance: 
 Cholamandalam Investment and Finance Company 
Subsidiaries 
Cholamandalam Securities Limited 
Cholamandalam Home Finance Limited 
 Cholamandalam MS General Insurance

 Others: 
 Ambadi Enterprises Ltd.
Subsidiaries
Parry Murray & Co Ltd
 Cholamandalam MS Risk Services Limited
 Murugappa Water Technology & Solutions

Previous

 MEL Systems & Services Ltd (Murugappa Electronics)
 LaserWords India Pvt Ltd (ePublishing)

Initiatives 
 The Madras Song

References

External links

Companies based in Chennai
Conglomerate companies established in 1900
Indian brands
Multinational companies headquartered in India
Indian companies established in 1900
Murugappa Group